Kongthoranee Sor.Sommai is a Thai Muay Thai fighter.

Titles and accomplishments
Professional Boxing Association of Thailand (PAT)
 2021 Thailand 135 lbs Champion
Rajadamnern Stadium
 2018 Rajadamnern Stadium 122 lbs Champion
 2022 Rajadamnern Stadium 135 lbs Champion

Fight record

|-  style="background:#cfc;"
| 2023-02-24|| Win ||align=left| Gingsanglek Tor.Laksong || ONE Friday Fights 6, Lumpinee Stadium || Bangkok, Thailand ||  KO (Left hook) || 2 ||1:02

|-  style="background:#cfc;"
| 2023-01-09|| Win ||align=left| Petchthonglor JoeNuvo || Muay Thai Pantamit || Chiang Rai, Thailand || Decision ||5 ||3:00 
|-  style="background:#cfc;"
| 2022-12-17|| Win ||align=left| Petchseenin Tded99 || Omnoi Stadium || Samut Sakhon, Thailand || KO (Elbow)||4 || 
|-  style="background:#fbb;"
| 2022-11-20|| Loss||align=left| Jom Parunchai || Channel 7 Stadium || Bangkok, Thailand || Decision|| 5 ||3:00 
|-  style="background:#cfc"
| 2022-08-31 || Win||align=left| Prajanban SorJor.VichitMuangPadriew || Muay Thai Palangmai, Rajadamnern Stadium || Bangkok, Thailand ||Decision ||5 ||3:00
|-  style="background:#fbb"
| 2022-08-02 || Loss ||align=left| Kompatak SinbiMuayThai || Birthday Pitaktham Super Fight || Songkhla province, Thailand || Decision ||5 ||3:00 
|-  style="background:#fbb;"
| 2022-06-26|| Loss||align=left| Jom Parunchai || Chang Muaythai Kiatphet, Rajadamnern Stadium || Bangkok, Thailand || Decision || 5 ||3:00 
|-
! style=background:white colspan=9 |

|-  style="background:#fbb;"
| 2022-04-16|| Loss ||align=left| Kompatak FighterMuayThai ||Sor.Sommai + Pitaktham	 || Phayao province, Thailand || Decision || 5 ||3:00 
|-  style="background:#cfc;"
| 2022-03-20 || Win ||align=left| Gingsanglek Tor.Laksong ||Chang Muaythai Kiatphet, Rajadamnern Stadium || Bangkok, Thailand || TKO (Doctor stoppage)||  5||
|-
! style=background:white colspan=9 |
|-  style="background:#cfc;"
| 2022-02-27||Win ||align=left| Kampitewada Nayok-Ek Anglim ||Muaydee Vithithai+Jitmuangnont, Nontaburi Stadium || Bangkok, Thailand || Decision ||  5||3:00

|-  style="background:#cfc;"
| 2021-12-04|| Win ||align=left| Buakiew Por.Paoin || Omnoi Stadium || Samut Sakhon, Thailand || Decision || 5 ||3:00

|-  style="background:#cfc;"
| 2021-11-13|| Win||align=left| Chatpayak Chor.Hapayak ||Suekjao Muaythai, Omnoi Stadium ||Samut Sakhon, Thailand || KO (Left Cross) ||1 ||
|-
! style=background:white colspan=9 |
|-  style="background:#fbb;"
| 2021-04-24|| Loss ||align=left| Gingsanglek Tor.Laksong || Omnoi Stadium ||Samut Sakhon, Thailand || Decision || 5 || 3:00 
|-
! style=background:white colspan=9 |
|-  style="background:#CCFFCC;"
| 2021-03-15|| Win ||align=left| Chatpayak Chor.Hapayak || Rajadamnern Stadium ||Bangkok, Thailand || Decision || 5 || 3:00
|-  style="background:#fbb;"
| 2020-12-12|| Loss ||align=left| Petchmanee Por.Lakboon || Isuzu Cup, Omnoi Stadium || Samut Sakhon, Thailand || Decision ||5  ||3:00
|-  style="background:#cfc;"
| 2020-11-07|| Win||align=left| Teeradet Chor.Hapayak || Isuzu Cup, Omnoi Stadium || Samut Sakhon, Thailand ||KO (Elbow)||4  ||
|-  style="background:#fbb;"
| 2020-10-10|| Loss||align=left| Extra Rongsamak-OrBorJor.Udon || Isuzu Cup, Omnoi Stadium || Samut Sakhon, Thailand ||Decision ||5  ||3:00
|-  style="background:#fbb;"
| 2020-08-14|| Loss||align=left| Dechsakda SorJor.TongPrachin || Muaymanwansuk, Rangsit Stadium || Rangsit, Thailand ||Decision ||5  ||3:00
|-  style="background:#FFBBBB;"
| 2019-12-26|| Loss ||align=left| Phetpangan Mor.Ratanabandit || Rajadamnern Stadium ||Bangkok, Thailand || Decision || 5 || 3:00
|-  style="background:#FFBBBB;"
| 2019-12-04|| Loss||align=left| Kiewpayak Jitmuangnon || Rajadamnern Stadium || Bangkok, Thailand || Decision (Unanimous) || 5 || 3:00
|-  style="background:#CCFFCC;"
| 2019-10-29|| Win ||align=left|  Kompatak SinbiMuayThai  || Lumpinee Stadium ||Bangkok, Thailand || Decision || 5 || 3:00
|-  style="background:#FFBBBB;"
| 2019-09-02|| Loss ||align=left| Phetpangan Mor.Ratanabandit || Rajadamnern Stadium ||Bangkok, Thailand || Decision || 5 || 3:00
|-  style="background:#CCFFCC;"
| 2019-07-09|| Win ||align=left| Sing Parunchai || Lumpinee Stadium ||Bangkok, Thailand || KO (Left high kick) || 2 ||
|-  style="background:#CCFFCC;"
| 2019-04-25|| Win ||align=left| Phetpangan Mor.Ratanabandit || Rajadamnern Stadium ||Bangkok, Thailand || Decision || 5 || 3:00
|-  style="background:#CCFFCC;"
| 2019-03-14|| Win ||align=left| Padetsuk Kor.Kampanath || Rajadamnern Stadium ||Bangkok, Thailand || Decision || 5 || 3:00
|-
! style=background:white colspan=9 |
|-  style="background:#FFBBBB;"
| 2019-02-14|| Loss ||align=left| Yodkhunsuk Mor.Chombueng Rajabhat || Rajadamnern Stadium ||Bangkok, Thailand || Decision || 5 || 3:00
|-  style="background:#c5d2ea;"
| 2018-10-18|| Draw ||align=left| Prajanban Sor.Jor.Vichitpadriew || Rajadamnern Stadium ||Bangkok, Thailand || Decision || 5 || 3:00
|-  style="background:#CCFFCC;"
| 2018-08-23|| Win ||align=left| Puenkon Diamond98 || Rajadamnern Stadium ||Bangkok, Thailand || KO (left high kick) || 4 || 2:00
|-  style="background:#CCFFCC;"
| 2018-06-28|| Win ||align=left| Yodkhunsuk Mor.Chombueng Rajabhat || Rajadamnern Stadium ||Bangkok, Thailand || Decision || 5 || 3:00
|-
! style=background:white colspan=9 |
|-  style="background:#CCFFCC;"
| 2018-05-17|| Win ||align=left| Phetrung Sitnayokkaipadriew || Rajadamnern Stadium ||Bangkok, Thailand || Decision || 5 || 3:00
|-  style="background:#CCFFCC;"
| 2018-03-12|| Win ||align=left| Boonlong Klongsuanpluresort || Rajadamnern Stadium ||Bangkok, Thailand || Decision || 5 || 3:00
|-  style="background:#CCFFCC;"
| 2018-01-31|| Win ||align=left| Somraknoi Muayded 789 || Rajadamnern Stadium ||Bangkok, Thailand || Decision || 5 || 3:00
|-  style="background:#CCFFCC;"
| 2017-12-30|| Win ||align=left| Kaokarat Jitmuangnon || Omnoi Stadium ||Thailand || KO (Left cross) || 4 ||
|-  style="background:#FFBBBB;"
| 2017-11-15|| Loss ||align=left| Teptaksin Sor.Sonsing || Rajadamnern Stadium ||Bangkok, Thailand || Decision || 5 || 3:00
|-  style="background:#CCFFCC;"
| 2017-08-31|| Win ||align=left| Saoek Kesagym || Rajadamnern Stadium ||Bangkok, Thailand || KO (left elbow) || 4 ||
|-  style="background:#FFBBBB;"
| 2017-07-10|| Loss ||align=left| Chamuakphet Lukpabath || Rajadamnern Stadium ||Bangkok, Thailand || Decision || 5 || 3:00
|-  style="background:#CCFFCC;"
| 2017-04-06|| Win ||align=left| Yodbuadaeng The glaff Pattaya || Rajadamnern Stadium ||Bangkok, Thailand || Decision || 5 || 3:00
|-  style="background:#CCFFCC;"
| 2017-03-09|| Win ||align=left| Saotho Kesagym || Rajadamnern Stadium ||Bangkok, Thailand || Decision || 5 || 3:00
|-  style="background:#CCFFCC;"
| 2017-02-09|| Win ||align=left| Phetrungroth Ror.Keracorath || Rajadamnern Stadium ||Bangkok, Thailand || Decision || 5 || 3:00
|-  style="background:#CCFFCC;"
| 2017-01-04|| Win ||align=left| Rit Jitmuangnon || Rajadamnern Stadium ||Bangkok, Thailand || Decision || 5 || 3:00
|-  style="background:#CCFFCC;"
| 2016-11-23|| Win ||align=left| Saeng-Ada Petchtepha-Farm || Rajadamnern Stadium ||Bangkok, Thailand || KO || 4 ||
|-  style="background:#CCFFCC;"
| 2016-08-31|| Win ||align=left| Phetsiwa Sor.Kittichai || Rajadamnern Stadium ||Bangkok, Thailand || Decision || 5 || 3:00
|-  style="background:#CCFFCC;"
| 2016-06-26|| Win ||align=left|  Nontachai Sor.Kanjana || Rajadamnern Stadium ||Bangkok, Thailand || KO || 4 ||
|-  style="background:#FFBBBB;"
| 2016-05-12|| Loss ||align=left| Chatploy Sor.Poonsawat || Rajadamnern Stadium ||Bangkok, Thailand || KO || 5 ||
|-  style="background:#FFBBBB;"
| 2016-03-24|| Loss ||align=left| Saoek Kesagym || Rajadamnern Stadium ||Bangkok, Thailand || Decision || 5 || 3:00
|-  style="background:#CCFFCC;"
| 2016-02-25|| Win ||align=left| Kiewpilin Sor.Kittichai || Rajadamnern Stadium ||Bangkok, Thailand || KO || 2 ||
|-  style="background:#FFBBBB;"
| 2016-01-18|| Loss ||align=left| Saoek Kesagym || Rajadamnern Stadium ||Bangkok, Thailand || Decision || 5 || 3:00
|-  style="background:#CCFFCC;"
| 2015-12-24|| Win ||align=left| Phetsakon F.A.Group || Rajadamnern Stadium ||Bangkok, Thailand || KO || 5 ||
|-  style="background:#FFBBBB;"
| 2015-10-19|| Loss ||align=left| ToTo Tor.Thawat || Rajadamnern Stadium ||Bangkok, Thailand || Decision || 5 || 3:00
|-  style="background:#FFBBBB;"
| 2015-09-07|| Loss ||align=left| Cherry Duangjaiphor || Rajadamnern Stadium ||Bangkok, Thailand || Decision || 5 || 3:00
|-  style="background:#CCFFCC;"
| 2015-08-05|| Win ||align=left| Den Sor.PhetUdon || Rajadamnern Stadium ||Bangkok, Thailand || Decision || 5 || 3:00
|-  style="background:#FFBBBB;"
| 2015-02-09|| Loss ||align=left| Sayanlek Sayangym || Rajadamnern Stadium ||Bangkok, Thailand || Decision || 5 || 3:00
|-  style="background:#FFBBBB;"
| 2015-01-07|| Loss ||align=left| Chatploy Sor.Poonsawat || Rajadamnern Stadium ||Bangkok, Thailand || Decision || 5 || 3:00
|-  style="background:#FFBBBB;"
| 2014-11-20|| Loss ||align=left| Mongkonngoen Tor.Morsi || Rajadamnern Stadium ||Bangkok, Thailand || Decision || 5 || 3:00
|-  style="background:#CCFFCC;"
| 2014-09-11|| Win ||align=left| Kiewpayak Jitmuangnon || Rajadamnern Stadium ||Bangkok, Thailand || Decision || 5 || 3:00
|-  style="background:#CCFFCC;"
| 2014-06-26|| Win ||align=left| Kiewpayak Jitmuangnon || Rajadamnern Stadium ||Bangkok, Thailand || Decision || 5 || 3:00
|-  style="background:#CCFFCC;"
| 2014-04-21|| Win ||align=left| Narongdej A.Wanchet || Rajadamnern Stadium ||Bangkok, Thailand || Decision || 5 || 3:00
|-
| colspan=9 | Legend:

References

Kongthoranee Sor.Sommai
ONE Championship kickboxers 
Living people
1996 births
Kongthoranee Sor.Sommai